Polyipnus ruggeri is a species of ray-finned fish in the genus Polyipnus. It is found in the Indo-Pacific.

References

Fish described in 1971
Sternoptychidae